Tug Wilson is the name of:

 Arthur Wilson (Royal Navy officer) (1842–1921), British Royal Navy admiral of the fleet and Victoria Cross recipient
 Dyson Wilson (1926–2011), British international rugby player
 Eben Wilson (1869–1948), American collegiate football player and coach
 Tug Wilson (British Army officer) (1921–2009), British Army colonel and founder and first commander of the Abu Dhabi Defence Force
 Ernie Wilson (English footballer) (1899–1955), English footballer for Brighton & Hove Albion
 Tug Wilson (baseball) (George Wilson, 1860–1914), Major League Baseball player
 Jimmy Wilson (footballer, born 1924) (1924–1987), English footballer for Watford
 Kenneth L. Wilson (1896–1979), American discus thrower and amateur athletics administrator
 Les Wilson (baseball) (1885–1969), American baseball player
 Roi Wilson (1921–2009), British Royal Navy captain and aviator
 Tug Wilson (footballer) (Thomas Wilson, 1917–1959), English footballer for Gillingham